Karen Rosenberg (born 20 June 1975), better known by her mononym Karen is a Danish R&B singer. She released three albums. Her debut album En til en in 2000 was produced by Saqib of Outlandish and Lasse Lindholm of Hvid Sjokolade. Her follow-up album. The album was nominated to three awards during the Danish Music Awards eventually winning Best R&B. She also became famous with "Vis mig du' min mand" taken from the album. Her follow-up album Ingen smalle steder in 2004 was produced by her boyfriend producer Vagn Luv. In 2009, she released Stiletto,<ref>[http://gaffa.dk/anmeldelse/31770 Gaffa.dk Sohail Hassan review of Karen's album Stiletto] </ref> but with much lesser success. the album didn't chart on the Tracklisten.

In addition to music, she has become a radio and television celebrity. In 2002, she gained a role in sitcom Langt fra Las Vegas. She presents P3 radio station's Karen & Szhirley'' with co host Szhirley Haim. The program broadcasts's the best R&B releases in Denmark. She is also one of five official judges during the Dansk Melodi Grand Prix in 2011.

Discography

Albums

Singles

Featured in

References

1975 births
Living people
21st-century Danish women  singers